José Agustín Domínguez y Diaz (born 1790 in Villa de Zaachila – died 1859) was a Mexican clergyman and bishop for the Roman Catholic Archdiocese of Antequera, Oaxaca. He was ordained in 1814. He was appointed bishop in 1854. He died in 1859.

References 

1790 births

1859 deaths
Mexican Roman Catholic bishops
People from Oaxaca